Lødingen Church is a parish church of the Church of Norway in Lødingen Municipality in Nordland county, Norway. It is located in the village of Lødingen. It is the main church for the Lødingen parish which is part of the Vesterålen prosti (deanery) in the Diocese of Sør-Hålogaland. The white, wooden church was built in a cruciform style in 1897 using plans drawn up by an unknown architect. The church seats about 350 people.

History
The earliest existing historical records of the church parish date back to 1432, but the church was not new at that time. Not much is known about the early church buildings on the site. The medieval church was a stave church. Around the year 1700, the old stave church was torn down and replaced with a new building. In 1750, the church was described as a log building with a cruciform floor plan and a steeple on the roof. In October 1755, the church was struck by lightning and burned down. A new church was completed the next year. The new church was a timber-framed building with a cruciform floor plan, a small tower over the nave. It also had a sacristy next to the chancel on the east end of the building.

In 1814, this church served as an election church. Together with more than 300 other parish churches across Norway, it was a polling station for elections to the 1814 Norwegian Constituent Assembly which wrote the Constitution of Norway. This was Norway's first national elections. Each church parish was a constituency that elected people called "electors" who later met together in each county to elect the representatives for the assembly that was to meet in Eidsvoll later that year.

That church stood until 1897 when it was taken down and rebuilt reusing some of the same materials and a similar design. On 1 January 2020, the churches in Lødingen Municipality were transferred from the Ofoten prosti to the Vesterålen prosti.

Media gallery

See also
List of churches in Sør-Hålogaland

References

External links
 

Lødingen
Churches in Nordland
Wooden churches in Norway
Cruciform churches in Norway
19th-century Church of Norway church buildings
Churches completed in 1897
14th-century establishments in Norway
Norwegian election church